The Citizen Lab is an interdisciplinary laboratory based at the Munk School of Global Affairs at the University of Toronto, Canada. It was founded by Ronald Deibert in 2001. The laboratory studies information controls that impact the openness and security of the Internet and that pose threats to human rights. The organization uses a "mixed methods" approach which combines computer-generated interrogation, data mining, and analysis with intensive field research, qualitative social science, and legal and policy analysis methods. The Citizen Lab was a founding partner of the OpenNet Initiative (2002–2013) and the Information Warfare Monitor (2002–2012) projects. The organization also developed the original design of the Psiphon censorship circumvention software, which was spun out of the Lab into a private Canadian corporation (Psiphon Inc.) in 2008.

History 
In a 2009 report "Tracking GhostNet", researchers uncovered a suspected cyber espionage network of over 1,295 infected hosts in 103 countries between 2007 and 2009, a high percentage of which were high-value targets, including ministries of foreign affairs, embassies, international organizations, news media, and NGOs. The study was one of the first public reports to reveal a cyber espionage network that targeted civil society and government systems internationally.

In Shadows in the Cloud (2010), researchers documented a complex ecosystem of cyber espionage that systematically compromised government, business, academic, and other computer network systems in India, the offices of the Dalai Lama, the United Nations, and several other countries. According to a January 24, 2019 AP News report, Citizen Lab researchers were "being targeted"  by "international undercover operatives" for its work on NSO Group.

In Million Dollar Dissident, published in August 2016, researchers discovered that Ahmed Mansoor, one of the UAE Five, a human rights defender in the United Arab Emirates, was targeted with Pegasus software developed by Israeli "cyber war" company NSO Group. Prior to the releases of the report, researchers contacted Apple who released a security update that patched the vulnerabilities exploited by the spyware operators. Mansoor was imprisoned one year later and as of 2021, is still in jail.

Researchers reported in October 2018, that NSO Group surveillance software was used to spy on the "inner circle" of Jamal Khashoggi just before his murder, "are being targeted in turn by international undercover operatives." A Citizen Lab October report revealed that NSO's "signature spy software" which had been placed on the iPhone of Saudi dissident Omar Abdulaziz, one of Khashoggi's confidantes, months before. Abdulaziz said that Saudi Arabia spies used the hacking software to reveal Khashoggi's "private criticisms of the Saudi royal family". He said this "played a major role" in his death.

In March 2019, The New York Times reported that Citizen Lab had been a target of the UAE contractor DarkMatter.

In November 2019, Ronan Farrow released a Podcast called "Catch and Kill," an extension of his book of the same name. The first episode includes Farrow's reporting on an instance in which a source of Farrow's was involved in a counter-espionage incident while operatives from Black Cube were targeting Citizen Lab.

Funding 
Financial support for the Citizen Lab has come from the Ford Foundation, the Open Society Institute, the Social Sciences and Humanities Research Council of Canada, the International Development Research Centre (IDRC), the Government of Canada, the Canada Centre for Global Security Studies at the University of Toronto's Munk School of Global Affairs, the John D. and Catherine T. MacArthur Foundation, the Donner Canadian Foundation, the Open Technology Fund, and The Walter and Duncan Gordon Foundation. The Citizen Lab has received donations of software and support from VirusTotal, RiskIQ and Cisco’s AMP Threat Grid Team

Reception 
The Citizen Lab has won a number of awards for its work. It is the first Canadian institution to win the MacArthur Foundation’s MacArthur Award for Creative and Effective Institutions (2014) and the only Canadian institution to receive a "New Digital Age" Grant (2014) from Google Executive Chairman Eric Schmidt. Past awards include the Electronic Frontier Foundation Pioneer award (2015), the Canadian Library Association's Advancement of Intellectual Freedom in Canada Award (2013), the Canadian Committee for World Press Freedom's Press Freedom Award (2011), and the Canadian Journalists for Free Expression’s Vox Libera Award (2010).

References

External links
 

University of Toronto
Laboratories in Canada
Computer surveillance
Internet-related organizations
2001 establishments in Ontario
Organizations established in 2001